Dubuque is an unincorporated community in Barton and Russell Counties in the U.S. state of Kansas.

History
Polish immigrants from Illinois, Indiana, and Wisconsin first settled the area after the American Civil War. They were soon followed by Volga Germans from Minnesota, Wisconsin, and Dubuque, Iowa. A rural post office named Dubuque opened in 1879, and the village was formally established in 1887. Devout Catholics, the local townsfolk built their first church in the early 1870s. They replaced it in 1901 with St. Catherine Catholic Church which still stands. The post office closed in 1909. By the 1920s, Dubuque had begun to lose its population and its business community. Today, all that remains is the Catholic church and a cemetery.

Geography

Education
The community is served by Central Plains USD 112 public school district.

References

Further reading

External links
 Barton County maps: Current, Historic, KDOT
 Russell County maps: Current, Historic, KDOT

Unincorporated communities in Barton County, Kansas
Unincorporated communities in Russell County, Kansas
Unincorporated communities in Kansas
Populated places established in 1887